is a Japanese actress and former gravure idol who is represented by the talent agency, Artist-house Pyramid.

Filmography

Variety

Regular

Quasi-regular

One-shot guest appearance

Former regular and quasi-regular

Drama

Films

References

External links
 Official profile 
  

Japanese actresses
Japanese gravure models
Japanese idols
Japanese television personalities
1982 births
Living people
People from Sapporo